InterJet was a private jet charter operator in the Greek business aviation market. InterJet was based in Athens and served the business community by chartering luxury private jets and helicopters for business needs and leisure breaks.

Fleet
The InterJet fleet included the following aircraft (at 2 February 2009):

1 × Citation V Ultra
1 × Citation CJ3
3 × Citation XL/XLS
1 × Citation Sovereign
1 × Embraer Legacy 600
1 × Dassault Falcon 2000 EX

InterJet also operated 4 twin-engined helicopters.

References

External links

InterJet amateur fleet list

Defunct airlines of Greece
Airlines established in 1992
Airlines disestablished in 2011
Greek companies established in 1992